Ed Kalman (born 7 December 1982) is a former Scottish rugby union internationalist, who played for Glasgow Warriors in the Pro12. He played as a prop; both at tighthead and loosehead.

Rugby Union career

Amateur career

Having moved to Scotland from an early age, Kalman went to Belmont House School in Newton Mearns, East Renfrewshire. He joined the local rugby club Whitecraigs RFC. He played for the Glasgow District team for their under-20s from 2000–2002.

After his Scottish schooling, he went to Durham University to study physics. He was a member of the Durham University rugby side that won the 2004 BUSA final at Twickenham.

From the north-east he then moved to Cambridge University. He was at tight head in the Cambridge University R.U.F.C. team who beat Oxford in the 2005 University match at Twickenham.

He played in a Gael Force team formed by the SRU to play in the British and Irish Cup.

Professional career

In the north-east of England he was signed by Newcastle Falcons academy. He played one loan game for Yorkshire Carnegie, then as Leeds Tykes.

He joined the Border Reivers in summer 2006 and his competition debut for Reivers was a replacement against Connacht at Netherdale on the opening day of the 2006–07 Magners League, and he had his first start the following month in the victory against another Irish province, Leinster, also at Netherdale. His first Reivers try was in the Heineken Cup victory against Overmach Parma at Netherdale in October 2006.

Ed Kalman joined Glasgow Warriors from the Reivers after the closure of the Borders pro-team in 2007.

The prop signed a new deal with the Warriors in 2011. He retired from playing rugby union at the end of season 2013–14 due to a back injury.

International career

Ed made his first appearance in a national context as a replacement for Scotland A against their Australian counterparts at McDiarmid Park, Perth, in November 2006. He also had a replacement role in the A international victory against Italy on the same ground three months later.

In January 2012, he was called up to Scotland's senior squad for the 2012 Six Nations Championship.

Teaching career

With his physics background at Durham University, he became a physics teacher and given his rugby background, the first team rugby coach; to Strathallan School, Perthshire in 2014

References

External links
ESPN Profile
Glasgowwarriors Profile

1982 births
People educated at Belmont House School
Alumni of Fitzwilliam College, Cambridge
Living people
Scotland international rugby union players
Glasgow Warriors players
Border Reivers players
Rugby union props
Scotland 'A' international rugby union players
Whitecraigs RFC players
Durham University RFC players
Alumni of Durham University
Gael Force players